The 2003 Virginia Cavaliers football team represented the University of Virginia in the 2003 NCAA Division I-A football season. The team's head coach was Al Groh. They played their home games at Scott Stadium in Charlottesville, Virginia.

Schedule

Personnel

Coaching staff

References

Virginia
Virginia Cavaliers football seasons
Duke's Mayo Bowl champion seasons
Virginia Cavaliers football